Tecomeae is a tribe with 44 genera of trees, shrubs, and vines in the family Bignoniaceae.

Genera 

 Argylia
 Astianthus
 Campsidium
 Campsis
 Catalpa
 Catophractes
 Chilopsis
 Cybistax
 Delostoma
 Deplanchea
 Digomphia
 Dinklageodoxa
 Dolichandrone
 Ekmanianthe
 Fernandoa
 Godmania
 Haplophragma
 Heterophragma
 Incarvillea
 Jacaranda
 Lamiodendron
 Markhamia
 Neosepicaea
 Newbouldia
 Pajanelia
 Pandorea
 Paratecoma
 Pauldopia
 Perianthomega
 Perichlaena
 Podranea
 Radermachera
 Rhigozum
 Romeroa
 Santisukia
 Sparattosperma
 Spathodea
 Spirotecoma
 Stereospermum
 Tabebuia
 Tecoma
 Tecomanthe
 Tecomella
 Zeyheria

References

External links

Bignoniaceae
Asterid tribes